The 1968 Gillette Cup was the sixth Gillette Cup, an English limited overs county cricket tournament. It was held between 27 April and 7 September 1968. The tournament was won by Warwickshire County Cricket Club who defeated Sussex County Cricket Club by 4 wickets in the final at Lord's.

The newly launched London Weekend Television won the rights to show the final throughout the ITV network, considered a major coup when set alongside the strong association the BBC then had with cricket (and would for another thirty years).  They received huge opprobrium from the press and public for cutting away from the match near its climax to show adverts, and LWT – already facing serious problems because of an industrial dispute and because much of its output was considered too high-minded for ITV – would never cover cricket again.

Format
The seventeen first-class counties, were joined by five Minor Counties: Bedfordshire, Cheshire, Dorset, Durham and Norfolk. Teams who won in the first round progressed to the second round. The winners in the second round then progressed to the quarter-final stage. Winners from the quarter-finals then progressed to the semi-finals from which the winners then went on to the final at Lord's which was held on 7 September 1968.

Results

First round

Second round

Quarter-finals

Semi-finals

Final

References

External links
CricketArchive tournament page 

Friends Provident Trophy seasons
Gillette Cup, 1968